Voetbalvereniging Sterk Door Combinatie, more commonly known as VV SteDoCo or simply SteDoCo, is a Dutch football club based in the towns of Hoornaar and Hoogblokland in the Molenlanden, South Holland. It currently plays in the Derde Divisie, the fourth tier of Dutch football.

The club plays their home games at Sportpark SteDoCo. The club colours, reflected in their crest and kit, are red and black.

History 
Formed on 15 April 1946, SteDoCo has spent its entire existence in the amateur tiers, mostly playing in the Vierde Klasse. In 2007, SteDoCo experienced a surge towards the upper tiers of the amateur divisions, achieving five promotions in eight years, after a larger number of sponsors pushed the club towards new ambitions. Since 2018, the team competes in the fourth-tier Derde Divisie. 

In the first round of the 2021–22 KNVB Cup, SteDoCo lost 5-0 to Eredivisie side FC Utrecht in front of 2,300 people.

References

External links
 Official site

 
Football clubs in the Netherlands
Association football clubs established in 1946
1946 establishments in the Netherlands
Sport in Molenlanden
Football clubs in South Holland